Mohotti Arachchilage Sriyani Kulawansha-Fonsekca (born 1 March 1970) is a retired Sri Lankan hurdler. Her personal best time was 12.91 seconds, achieved in the quarter-finals of the 1996 Summer Olympics in Atlanta.

She represented Sri Lanka in the 1992 Olympic Games held in Spain at the young age of 22. The 1996 Olympic Games held in US saw her advancing to the quarter finals of the 100m Hurdles event as she registered her personal best timing of 12.91 sec. Her final Olympic Games were the 2000 Sydney Olympics.

She was very consistent in the Asian Championships and her best year was 1998, where she won Silver in the Commonwealth Games and Bronze in the Asian Games. From 1989 to 2004 she has participated in over 70 International Games, and still holds the record in the South Asian Games for the hurdles event.

Early life 
Sriyani Kulawansha describes her childhood  as being the "vehicle of our house" as she used to run to buy groceries from her home located on a hill. It is there she realized her "energy and love" for sports.

She received her primary school education from Udakendawala Primary School and entered Ibbagamuwa Central College after passing the grade 5 scholarship exam. There she took part in all the four games for girls Athletics, Elle (a game like baseball), Netball and Volleyball and won the all island championship in all of them. And she won the best sportswoman award in 1989 for Athletics, Vollyball and Netball. She had to give up Netball and volleyball to focus on Athletics when she came to the national level.

She grew up in Melsiripura, a remote area in Sri Lanka's Kurunegala District.

Professional career 
While she was in 1989 South Asian Games practice squad she learned that high jump event has been cancelled due to lack of participants. But she credits her parents and coach Dervin Perera for motivating her to change to hurdles event.

She describes her biggest career achievement as winning the Silver Medals in the 1998 Commonwealth Games.

Sriyani retired from sports at the age of 34 even after getting selected to the 2004 Olympics. She says the decision was made because she knew that she had little chance to win and to give the opportunity to another athlete.

After retirement she was invited to work as a project officer at the Education Ministry to provide services to students.

Competition record

References

External links
 

1970 births
Living people
People from North Western Province, Sri Lanka
Sri Lankan female hurdlers
Olympic athletes of Sri Lanka
Athletes (track and field) at the 1992 Summer Olympics
Athletes (track and field) at the 1996 Summer Olympics
Athletes (track and field) at the 2000 Summer Olympics
Commonwealth Games medallists in athletics
Athletes (track and field) at the 1998 Commonwealth Games
Athletes (track and field) at the 2002 Commonwealth Games
Asian Games bronze medalists for Sri Lanka
Medalists at the 1998 Asian Games
Asian Games medalists in athletics (track and field)
Athletes (track and field) at the 1994 Asian Games
Athletes (track and field) at the 1998 Asian Games
Athletes (track and field) at the 2002 Asian Games
World Athletics Championships athletes for Sri Lanka
Commonwealth Games silver medallists for Sri Lanka
South Asian Games gold medalists for Sri Lanka
South Asian Games medalists in athletics
Medallists at the 1998 Commonwealth Games